Bia District is a former district that was located in Western Region, Ghana. Originally it was formerly part of the then-larger Juaboso-Bia District in 1988, which was created from the former Sefwi-Bibiani District Council, until the northwest part of the district was split off to create Bia District; thus the remaining part has been renamed as Juaboso-Bodi District. However, on 28 June 2012, it was split off into two new districts: Bia West District (capital: Sefwi Essam) and Bia East District (capital: Asokore Adaborkrom). The district assembly was located in the northwest part of Western Region and had Sefwi Essam as its capital town.

Sources
 
 Bia District

References

Districts of the Western North Region